Marty Brown may refer to:
Marty Brown (baseball) (born 1963), American former baseball player
Marty Brown (singer) (born 1965), American country singer

See also
Martin Brown (disambiguation)